Piotr Andrzej Kiełpikowski (born 27 November 1962) is a Polish fencer. He won a bronze medal in the team foil event at the 1992 Summer Olympics and a silver in the same event at the 1996 Summer Olympics.

References

1962 births
Living people
Polish male fencers
Olympic fencers of Poland
Fencers at the 1988 Summer Olympics
Fencers at the 1992 Summer Olympics
Fencers at the 1996 Summer Olympics
Olympic silver medalists for Poland
Olympic bronze medalists for Poland
Olympic medalists in fencing
People from Grudziądz
Medalists at the 1992 Summer Olympics
Medalists at the 1996 Summer Olympics
Sportspeople from Kuyavian-Pomeranian Voivodeship
20th-century Polish people
21st-century Polish people